María del Carmen García (born 27 July 1969) is a retired high jumper from Cuba, who set her personal best on 17 March 1990, jumping 1.92 metres at a meet in Manaus.

Achievements

References
 Women's World All-Time List

External links

Cuban female high jumpers
1969 births
Living people
Athletes (track and field) at the 1991 Pan American Games
Place of birth missing (living people)
Pan American Games medalists in athletics (track and field)
Pan American Games silver medalists for Cuba
Central American and Caribbean Games gold medalists for Cuba
Competitors at the 1990 Central American and Caribbean Games
Central American and Caribbean Games medalists in athletics
Medalists at the 1991 Pan American Games